The Accademia di Belle Arti di Frosinone is an academy of Fine arts located in Frosinone, Italy. It was founded in 1973.

Academics and alumni
 Jago (1987), sculptor

References

External links
  

Art schools in Italy
Education in Italy
Frosinone
Educational institutions established in 1973
1973 establishments in Italy